Charles H. Baldwin (June 30, 1839 – January 22, 1911) was an enlisted man in the United States Navy during the American Civil War. Fellow crewmen Alexander Crawford, John Lafferty, Benjamin Lloyd, and John W. Lloyd were also awarded the Medal of Honor for participating in the same plan. He is buried at Christ Episcopal Church in Accokeek, MD.

Biography
Charles H. Baldwin was born in Delaware. He is buried in Christ Church Cemetery, Accokeek, Maryland.

Medal of Honor citation
Rank and organization: Coal Heaver, U.S. Navy. Born: June 30, 1839, Delaware. Accredited to: Pennsylvania. G.O. No.: 45, December 31, 1864. 

Citation:
Serving on board the U.S.S. Wyalusing and participating in a plan to destroy the rebel ram Albermarle in Roanoke River, 25 May 1864. Volunteering for the hazardous mission, C.H. Baldwin participated in the transfer of 2 torpedoes across an island swamp. Weighted by a line which was used to transfer the torpedoes, he swam the river and, when challenged by a sentry, was forced to abandon the plan after erasing its detection and before it could be carried to completion. Escaping the fire of the muskets, C.H. Baldwin spent 2 days and nights of hazardous travel without food, and finally arrived, fatigued, at the mother ship.

Namesake
The destroyer  is named in his honor.

See also

List of American Civil War Medal of Honor recipients: A–F

References

Sources

1839 births
1911 deaths
Union Navy sailors
United States Navy Medal of Honor recipients
United States Navy sailors
People of Delaware in the American Civil War
American Civil War recipients of the Medal of Honor